Smilets Point (‘Nos Smilets’ \'nos smi-'lets\) is the rocky point on the southwest side of the entrance to Hall Cove, at the northeast end of Lambreva Beach, projecting 500 m north-northwestwards from the northwest coast of Nelson Island in the South Shetland Islands, Antarctica.  The area was visited by early 19th century sealers.

The point is named after Czar Smilets of Bulgaria, 1292–1298.

Location
British mapping in 1968.

Maps
 Livingston Island to King George Island.  Scale 1:200000.  Admiralty Nautical Chart 1776.  Taunton: UK Hydrographic Office, 1968.
 South Shetland Islands. Scale 1:200000 topographic map No. 3373. DOS 610 - W 62 58. Tolworth, UK, 1968.
 Antarctic Digital Database (ADD). Scale 1:250000 topographic map of Antarctica. Scientific Committee on Antarctic Research (SCAR). Since 1993, regularly upgraded and updated.

References
 Smilets Point. SCAR Composite Gazetteer of Antarctica.
 Bulgarian Antarctic Gazetteer. Antarctic Place-names Commission. (details in Bulgarian, basic data in English)

External links
 Smilets Point. Copernix satellite image

Headlands of the South Shetland Islands
Bulgaria and the Antarctic